Old Baptist Church Branch is a  long 1st order tributary to Fishing Branch in Kent County, Delaware.  This is the only stream of this name in the United States.

Course
Old Baptist Church Branch rises on the Murderkill River divide about 0.25 miles west of Spring Hill, Delaware.  Old Baptist Church Branch then flows southeast then northeast to meet Fishing Branch about 0.5 miles east of Spring Hill, Delaware.

Watershed
Old Baptist Church Branch drains  of area, receives about 45.5 in/year of precipitation, has a topographic wetness index of 613.40 and is about 8.0% forested.

See also
List of Delaware rivers

Maps

References

Rivers of Delaware
Rivers of Kent County, Delaware